Frank Schoeman (born 30 July 1975) is a South African former footballer who played at both professional and international levels as a defender. Schoeman played club football in South Africa for Bush Bucks and Mamelodi Sundowns, and in Denmark for Lyngby; he also earned thirteen caps for the South African national side between 1999 and 2001.

External links

1975 births
Living people
South African soccer players
South Africa international soccer players
South African expatriate soccer players
2002 African Cup of Nations players
Danish Superliga players
Expatriate men's footballers in Denmark
Bush Bucks F.C. players
Lyngby Boldklub players
Mamelodi Sundowns F.C. players
Association football defenders